The Revolutionary Worker's Party (POR) is a Uruguayan Trotskyist-Posadist party.

Established in 1944, it is a member of the Fourth International Posadist. In 1971 it took part in the establishment of the Broad Front.

References

External links

 

1944 establishments in Uruguay
Broad Front (Uruguay)
Communist parties in Uruguay
Fourth International Posadist
Political parties established in 1944
Political parties in Uruguay
Trotskyist organizations in Uruguay